Upper Cumberworth is a small village in West Yorkshire, England, within the civil parish of Denby Dale and the Diocese of Wakefield. It is between the villages of Denby Dale and Shepley, above the village of Lower Cumberworth. It occupies a rural location, surrounded by fields and woodland but close to Huddersfield, Barnsley, Wakefield and Sheffield by public transport or road.

The 2001 Census gave the population of Upper Cumberworth and Lower Cumberworth combined as 1,222.

Geography
The local woodlands are managed by the Upper Dearne Woodlands Conservation Group, who undertake tasks such as habitat conservation, access management, education and information. Many public footpaths run through the woodlands with information boards about plants and animals. The woodland runs into Birdsedge and contains more than 75 Hairy Northern Wood Ant (Formica lugubris) nests.

Education
The village has a small first school, Cumberworth CE (VA) First School.

Religious sites
The local Saint Nicholas' church is Anglican. The churchyard has a set of stocks by the entrance and some sculptural gravestones.

Sport
Upper Cumberworth and Lower Cumberworth have joint football and cricket teams. 
There is a small children's playground and a larger field which contains football and basketball facilities.

Notable people

John Hodgson, drummer/ percussionist with Rick Wakeman's English Rock Ensemble and Violinski, an ELO offshoot.

See also
Listed buildings in Denby Dale

References

External links

"Cumberworth: The Village", Ckcricketheritage.org.uk, Pdf download required. Retrieved 7 January 2012

Villages in West Yorkshire
Denby Dale